Diascopy is a test for blanchability performed by applying pressure with a finger or glass slide and observing color changes.

It is used to determine whether a lesion is vascular (inflammatory or congenital), nonvascular (nevus), or hemorrhagic (petechia or purpura). Hemorrhagic lesions and nonvascular lesions do not blanch ("negative diascopy"); inflammatory lesions do ("positive diascopy"). Diascopy is sometimes used to identify sarcoid skin lesions, which, when tested, turn an apple jelly color.

References

Dermatologic terminology